Friedrich Edmund "Fritz" Rieger (28 June 1910 – 30 September 1978), was a German conductor.

Rieger was born in Oberaltstadt, Karkonosze, Bohemia, Austria-Hungary.  From 1931 to 1938 he worked in Prague.  In August 1941 he became director of the Bremen Opera, and in August 1944 he took up the position of director of the Bremen Philharmonic Orchestra.  Rieger was a member of the Nazi party.

In 1949 Rieger was announced as the chief conductor of the Munich Philharmonic Orchestra by the city government, replacing the modernist Hans Rosbaud who had been appointed by U.S. occupation authorities.  According to author David Monod, the decision to release Rosbaud and replace him with the "young and relatively unknown but suitably conservative" Rieger was caused by a desire to attract larger audiences with more traditional programs, a necessity in the wake of currency reform in the western part of Germany.  In 1952, Rieger announced that the orchestra would eliminate almost all modern music from its concerts.  Rieger continued to lead the Munich orchestra until 1966.

Fritz Rieger was chief conductor of the Melbourne Symphony Orchestra from 1971 to 1972.

He died in Bonn, Germany, on 20 September 1978.

Notes

References

External links
 Fritz Rieger discography
Fritz Rieger biographical details 

1910 births
1978 deaths
German male conductors (music)
Commanders Crosses of the Order of Merit of the Federal Republic of Germany
20th-century German conductors (music)
20th-century German male musicians